Impatiens is a large, broadly distributed genus of flowering plants in the family Balsaminaceae. , there are over 1,000 accepted species in Kew's Plants of the World Online.

References

L
Impatiens